The by-election for the Great Grimsby took place on 28 April 1977.

It was caused by the death in February of Anthony Crosland, and was retained for Labour by Austin Mitchell.

It took place on the same day as the Labour defeat in Ashfield. The result in Grimsby and Ashfield were seen as a surprise as they were the opposite of what had been expected. Grimsby had been expected to fall to the Conservatives, while Labour had expected to hold Ashfield, which they had held by a much larger majority. In the event while there was a swing of 20.9% to the Conservatives in Ashfield, which was just enough to win the seat, the Labour to Conservative swing in Grimsby was only 7% and Mitchell managed to poll more votes than Crosland had at the last election. The Liberal Party lost its deposit in both Grimsby and Ashfield, the third time this had happened at a by-election following the 1977 Lib-Lab Pact.

At the next election, in 1979, Mitchell increased his majority to 6,241 votes.

References

Great Grimsby by-election
Politics of Grimsby
Elections in Lincolnshire
Great Grimsby by-election
Great Grimsby by-election
By-elections to the Parliament of the United Kingdom in Lincolnshire constituencies